Láng Machine Factory (Hungarian Láng Gépgyár) was a machine factory in Hungary that played an important role in supplying Hungarian power plants and factories with steam engines, turbines and diesel motors.

Founded in 1868 by László Láng as a machine repair workshop, the company started producing steam engines in 1873 and became the largest manufacturer of steam engines for factories and ships by the 1890s. The generators providing electric power to the Millenium Underground Railway were powered by Láng steam engines.  The company also made equipment for the distilling, sugar, and canning industries. 

From 1890, the company produced pumps, compressors, hydraulic tools, and electric crane machines. In 1893, the firm started to produce electric elevators. From 1905, the production of steam turbines for alternators began. In 1910 the factory extended its product portfolio with boilers and Diesel Engines for factories, power plants and ships. During the Great Depression it manufactured printing machinery as well.
After being nationalised in 1948, power generating machinery became the main focus of the company. Due to dwindling contracts and obsolete technology the production of Láng declined in the 1980s and it was acquired by ABB in 1990.

References 

Companies of Austria-Hungary
Manufacturing companies of Hungary
Hungarian brands
Electrical engineering companies
Companies established in 1868
1868 establishments in Hungary